The Sri Lanka cricket team toured the West Indies during March and April 2021 to play two Test matches, three One Day International (ODI) and three Twenty20 International (T20I) matches. The Tests formed part of the inaugural 2019–2021 ICC World Test Championship, and the ODI series formed part of the inaugural 2020–2023 ICC Cricket World Cup Super League.

In February 2021, Sri Lanka's coach Mickey Arthur and batsman Lahiru Thirimanne returned positive COVID-19 tests. This resulted in several media reports stating that the tour had been postponed. However, the following day, Cricket West Indies (CWI) announced their upcoming broadcast deal to show live cricket in the Caribbean, starting with hosting Sri Lanka across all three formats. On 16 February 2021, both cricket boards confirmed the dates for the fixtures.

Sri Lanka Cricket also formally appointed Dasun Shanaka as their T20I captain, replacing Lasith Malinga. Shanaka had previously captained the T20I side in October 2019, against Pakistan. However, Shanaka did not depart for the tour with the rest of the team due to visa issues, with Angelo Mathews named as Sri Lanka's stand-in captain for the T20I matches. Sri Lanka Cricket issued a statement saying that Shanka is expected to join up with the team once his visa issue has been resolved.

On 26 February 2021, the West Indies named their squads for the limited overs matches. Chris Gayle and Fidel Edwards were recalled to the T20I team, after last playing for the national side two and nine years ago respectively. On 11 March 2021, CWI formally appointed Kraigg Brathwaite as their Test captain, replacing Jason Holder. Brathwaite had previously captained the West Indies team in seven Tests.

On 2 March 2021, CWI named the match officials for the tour. Joel Wilson, who has been the on-field umpire for 19 Tests prior to the tour, stood in his first Test match at home. Gregory Brathwaite also made his debut as an on-field umpire in Test cricket.

The West Indies won the first T20I match by four wickets, with Sri Lanka winning the second match by 43 runs to level the series. The West Indies won the final match by three wickets to win the series 2–1. The West Indies won the first two ODI matches to win the series with a game to go. They went on to win the final match by five wickets, to take the series 3–0. Both Test matches finished as draws, therefore the series was also drawn 0–0.

Squads

Ahead of the tour, Lahiru Kumara was ruled out of Sri Lanka's white-ball squad due to a positive test for COVID-19, with Suranga Lakmal named as his replacement. Sri Lanka's Dasun Shanaka missed the T20I matches, after he was unable to travel due to visa issues. On 5 March 2021, Sri Lanka Cricket issued a statement stating that Shanka would join up with the team for the ODI matches. Prior to the second ODI match, Angelo Mathews left Sri Lanka's squad for the rest of the tour to return home due to a family matter. Ahead of the third ODI, Anderson Phillip was added to the West Indies' squad.

On 12 March 2021, Cricket West Indies named the squad for the first Test match, with Roston Chase, Jahmar Hamilton and Chemar Holder named as reserves and Jayden Seales as a developmental player.

Tour matches

T20I series

1st T20I

2nd T20I

3rd T20I

ODI series

1st ODI

2nd ODI

3rd ODI

Test series

1st Test

2nd Test

Statistics

Most runs (T20I)

Most wickets (T20I)

Most runs (ODI)

Most wickets (ODI)

Most runs (Test)

Most wickets (Test)

Bangladeshi cricket team in Sri Lanka in 2020–21

Notes

References

External links
 Series home at ESPN Cricinfo

2021 in Sri Lankan cricket
2021 in West Indian cricket
International cricket competitions in 2020–21
Sri Lankan cricket tours of the West Indies